Gerzeh (also Romanized as Gorzeh; also known as Bandar-e-Gowrzeh, Bandar-e-Gūrzeh, Bandar-e Korzeh, Gowrzeh, and Jirzeh) is a village in Bandar Charak Rural District, Shibkaveh District, Bandar Lengeh County, Hormozgan Province, Iran. At the 2006 census, its population was 805, in 130 families.

References 

Populated places in Bandar Lengeh County